Amélie Mauresmo was the two-time defending champion, and successfully defended her title, defeating Kim Clijsters in the final 6–4, 7–6(7–4) in a rematch of the previous year's final. By winning a third title, Mauresmo received a golden racket decorated with diamonds that is estimated to be worth $1.3 million.

Seeds

Draw

Finals

Top half

Bottom half

Notes
The winner will receive $88,265 and 275 ranking points.
The runner-up will receive $47,125 and 190 ranking points.
The last direct acceptance was Sybille Bammer.
The players' representative was Yanina Wickmayer.

Diamond Games
2007 WTA Tour